Rupiamma was a Great Satrap in India during the 2nd century CE, who is known from an inscription found at Pauni in Central India, south of the Narmada river.

Pillar inscription
A memorial pillar with an inscription in the name of "Mahakshatrapa Kumara Rupiamma" has been recovered in Pauni, and is dated to the 2nd century CE. Rupiamma is probably related to the Saka Western Satraps. This memorial pillar is thought to mark the southern extent of the conquests of the Western Satraps, much beyond the traditionally held boundary of the Narmada River. The use of the word "Kumara" may also mean that Rupiamma was the son of a Great Satrap, rather than holding the title himself.

The Middle Brahmi inscription reads:

Coinage

There are no coins of Rupiamma known, but coins belonging to the Western Satraps (Rudrasimha) were also discovered in the ruins of Buddhist stupas at Pauni. 

A few dozen donative inscriptions in the Brahmi script have been found at the site of Pauni, in a style similar to the inscriptions of Bharhut and Sanchi.

Kushan or Western Satrap?
It is not known is Rupiamma, as a "Great Satrap", should be understood as a representative of the Kushan Empire, or as one of the Western Satraps, whose own political relationship with the Kushan is not clearly known. If Rupiamma belonged to the Kushan hierarchy, this would suggest that Kushan control extended this far south, beyond the generally accepted southern boundary formed by the Narmada river. According to the recently discovered Rabatak inscription, Kushan dominions expanded into the heartland of northern India in the early 2nd century CE. Lines 4 to 7 of the inscription describe the cities which were under the rule of Kanishka, among which six names are identifiable: Ujjain, Kundina, Saketa, Kausambi, Pataliputra, and Champa (although the text is not clear whether Champa was a possession of Kanishka or just beyond it).

References

Sources
 

Western Satraps
2nd-century Indian monarchs